The 2014–15 George Washington Colonials men's basketball team represented George Washington University during the 2014–15 NCAA Division I men's basketball season. The Colonials, led by fourth year head coach Mike Lonergan, played their home games at the Charles E. Smith Center and were members of the Atlantic 10 Conference. They finished the season 22–13, 10–8 in A-10 play to finish in a three-way tie for sixth place. They advanced to the quarterfinals of the A-10 tournament where they lost to Rhode Island. They were invited to the National Invitation Tournament where they defeated Pittsburgh in the first round before losing in the second round to Temple.

Previous season 
The 2013–14 George Washington Colonials finished the season with an overall record of 24–9, with a record of 11–5 in the Atlantic 10 regular season in a tie for third place. In the 2014 Atlantic 10 tournament, the Colonials lost to VCU in the semifinals. They received an at-large bid to the NCAA tournament where they lost in the second round to Memphis.

Off season

Departures

Incoming Transfers

Incoming recruits

Roster

Schedule

|-
!colspan=9 style="background:#00285C; color:#EECFA1;"| Exhibition

|-
!colspan=9 style="background:#00285C; color:#EECFA1;"| Non-conference regular season

|-
!colspan=9 style="background:#00285C; color:#EECFA1;"| Atlantic 10 regular season

|-
!colspan=9 style="background:#00285C; color:#EECFA1;"| Atlantic 10 tournament

|-
!colspan=9 style="background:#00285C; color:#EECFA1;"| NIT

See also
 2014–15 George Washington Colonials women's basketball team

References

George Washington Colonials men's basketball seasons
George Washington
George Washington